Kabud Gonbad may refer to:

Kabud Gonbad, East Azerbaijan
Kabud Gonbad, Tehran
Kabud Gonbad, Zanjan
Kabud Gonbad Rural District, in Razavi Khorasan Province